The girls' slopestyle event at the 2016 Winter Youth  Olympics took place on 19 February at the Hafjell Freepark.

Results

References

External links
Results
 

Freestyle skiing at the 2016 Winter Youth Olympics